Mwanawina I was a Litunga (king or chief) of Barotseland in Africa.

Biography
Mwanawina was the youngest son of Prince Mbanga, 1st Chief of Nalolo, and brother to the king Yubya I. His mother was princess Notulu.

He succeeded on the death of his brother.

His wives were:
Lienenu
Nolianga
Princess Mbuywana

He died at the village of the Induna Namoyamba.

His sons were kings Mwananyanda Liwale and Mulambwa Santulu and princes Yutuluwakaole (crown prince) and Inyambo.

His grandsons were prince Mwanang'ono and kings Mubukwanu and Silumelume.

References

Litungas
19th-century rulers in Africa
18th-century rulers in Africa